Rebecca "Bex" Condie  (born 3 May 1990) in Hannover, Germany is a Scottish international field hockey player who plays as a defender for Scotland

She plays club hockey in the Investec Women's Hockey League Premier Division for Uni of Birmingham.

She is also a biology teacher in Dean Close Senior school

References

Living people
1990 births
Scottish female field hockey players
Field hockey players at the 2018 Commonwealth Games
Women's England Hockey League players
University of Birmingham Hockey Club players
Commonwealth Games competitors for Scotland